Gasterorhamphosus is an extinct genus of prehistoric bony fish that lived during the Campanian.

References

Gasterosteiformes
Late Cretaceous fish